ODCI may refer to:

 Office of the Director of Central Intelligence, a historical post (1946-2005) in the United States of America
 Oracle Data Cartridge Interface, a component of Oracle Database